Tyler Beechey (born. June 5, 1981) is a Canadian former professional ice hockey forward who is currently playing with the Innisfail Eagles in the semi-professional Chinook Hockey League (ChHL).

Undrafted, Beechey has previously played for the Straubing Tigers after joining on June 29, 2012, from the DEG Metro Stars.

On July 31, 2013, Beechey agreed to a one-year contract with his fifth German club, the newly promoted Schwenninger Wild Wings. In the 2013–14 season, Beechey played amongst the top scoring line with the Wild Wings recording 37 points in 49 games.

On July 17, 2014, Beechey continued his journeyman career in Germany, agreeing to a two-year contract with the Krefeld Pinguine.

Career statistics

Awards and honors

References

External links

1981 births
Living people
Augsburger Panther players
Calgary Hitmen players
Canadian ice hockey forwards
DEG Metro Stars players
Edmonton Ice players
Iserlohn Roosters players
Kootenay Ice players
Krefeld Pinguine players
Manitoba Moose players
Pensacola Ice Pilots players
Providence Bruins players
Ice hockey people from Edmonton
St. John's Maple Leafs players
Schwenninger Wild Wings players
Straubing Tigers players
Toronto Marlies players
Trenton Devils players
Trenton Titans players
Canadian expatriate ice hockey players in Germany